The 2000 DFB-Ligapokal Final decided the winner of the 2000 DFB-Ligapokal, the 4th edition of the reiterated DFB-Ligapokal, a knockout football cup competition.

The match was played on 1 August 2000 at the BayArena in Leverkusen. Bayern Munich won the match 5–1 against Hertha BSC for their 4th title.

Teams

Route to the final
The DFB-Ligapokal is a six team single-elimination knockout cup competition. There are a total of two rounds leading up to the final. Four teams enter the preliminary round, with the two winners advancing to the semi-finals, where they will be joined by two additional clubs who were given a bye. For all matches, the winner after 90 minutes advances. If still tied, extra time, and if necessary penalties are used to determine the winner.

Match

Details

References

2000
Hertha BSC matches
FC Bayern Munich matches
2000–01 in German football cups